The 2021 Junior World Weightlifting Championships were held in Tashkent, Uzbekistan from 23 to 31 May 2021.

Medalists

Men

Women

Medal table

Ranking by Big (Total result) medals 

Ranking by all medals: Big (Total result) and Small (Snatch and Clean & Jerk)

Team ranking

Men

Women

Participating nations
244 athletes (105 in women from 34 nations and 139 in men from 42 nations) from 53 nations competed. Additional 14 people competed only for Olympic points and quotas.

Most participants

Men's results
Green denotes athletes who can't compete in championships because they were born before 2001, but they compete as "extra athletes" to get results counted for the qualifications for 2020 Summer Olympics.

55 kg

61 kg

67 kg

73 kg

81 kg

89 kg

96 kg

102 kg

109 kg

+109 kg

Women's results
Green denotes athletes who can't compete in championships because they were born before 2001, but they compete as "extra athletes" to get results counted for the qualifications for 2020 Summer Olympics.

45 kg

49 kg

55 kg

59 kg

64 kg

71 kg

76 kg

81 kg

87 kg

+87 kg

References

External links
 

IWF Junior World Weightlifting Championships
International weightlifting competitions hosted by Uzbekistan
World Junior Weightlifting Championships
World Junior Weightlifting Championships
Weightlifting in Uzbekistan
Sport in Tashkent
Weightlifting